The Nebrodi is a mountain range that runs along the north east of Sicily. Together with the Madonie and the Peloritani, they form the Sicilian Apennines.

The mountains run from the Peloritani on the eastern part of the island to the foothill of the Madonie mountains to the west, facing the Tyrrhenian Sea on the north. Mount Etna, from which it is separated by the rivers Alcantara and Simeto, forms the range's southern border. Several of the peaks are above 1500 meters with the highest being the Monte Soro (1,847 m) and the Serra del Re (1,754 m). The range mostly made up of sandstone and clay rocks, but include also limestone landscapes, like the Rocche del Crasto where is located the Grotta del Lauro abundant of stalactites and stalagmites . Towns that are situated in the mountains include Troina, Nicosia, Mistretta, and a number of other towns in the province of Messina.

Much of the mountains are covered by thick forests of cork trees on the lowest slopes giving way to oak and then beech at the higher elevations.  Yew trees occur in the beech forests. In many areas the upland forest has been cleared to make mountain pastures.

Parco dei Nebrodi
On 4 August 1993 large areas of the Nebrodi Mountains were made into national parkland. The park covers 856.87 km². It touches on many of the comuni in the mountains and is one of the largest protected parks in Sicily.

References

External links
 Your Guide to Municipalities Nebrodi
 Photo gallery of the Nebrodi Mountains
 
 

Mountain ranges of Italy
Mountains of Sicily
Mountain ranges of Sicily